Unterschleißheim (Central Bavarian: Untaschleißheim) is a town in Bavaria, Germany. It is located about 17 km north of the city limits of Munich, and has a resident population of 29,464 (December 31, 2021).

History
Unterschleißheim was first mentioned in a document from 785, although the area has traces of settlements from 1400 BC.  During World War II, a women's subcamp of Dachau concentration camp was located here.  The town's 1200th anniversary in 1985 incorporated the inauguration of the new town center with the Town Hall and Citizens Advice Bureau.  On December 16, 2000, Unterschleißheim was granted privileges of a town, known as 'Stadtrecht' in German.

Unterschleißheim's coat of arms symbolises the city's past and present. The shield of the coat of arms is divided. The upper part shows a golden zigzag line on a blue background. The lower part incorporates a green branch of a spruce and a green oak leaf on a golden background.

Unterschleißheim is the home of a corporate office of Adobe Systems, as well as the headquarters of Microsoft's subsidiary in Germany and for Eastern Europe. Schwaneberger Verlag, the publisher of the Michel catalog for philatelists, also has its office in Unterschleißheim.

Recreation
Lake Unterschleißheim was created from 1979–1980 by extracting fill to build the Autobahn. With numerous shallow areas this is a popular summer gathering area for families with children,  and used frequently for ice skating and curling in the winter.

Transport
Unterschleißheim is situated at the crossroads of two Autobahns, the A99 and A92 with direct routes to Stuttgart, Nuremberg and the  Munich Airport Franz Josef Strauß. Two S-Bahn stations on the Munich–Regensburg line, served by S1 trains, connect Unterschleißheim with the regional rail system.

Twin towns – sister cities

Unterschleißheim is twinned with:
 Le Crès, France
 Zengőalja (microregion), Hungary

References

External links
 
  
 Official Imageclip about Unterschleißheim

Munich (district)